David Fumero (born Joseph Sentielo-Fumero on December 29, 1972) is a Cuban-American actor and former fashion model. Fumero is best known for his role as Cristian Vega on One Life to Live.

Personal life
David Fumero was born on December 29, 1972, in Havana, Cuba. He is an actor and a former United States Marine.

On December 9, 2007, Fumero married his One Life to Live co-star Melissa Fumero (née Gallo) who played Adriana Cramer on the show. They have two children together, a son born in March 2016 and another son born in February 2020.

Filmography

Film

Television

Music Videos

References

External links

1972 births
Living people
American entertainers of Cuban descent
American male soap opera actors
American male television actors
Cuban emigrants to the United States
Hispanic and Latino American male actors
Hispanic and Latino American male models
Male actors from Havana
Male actors from Miami
Male models from Florida
United States Marines